Limerick Cricket Club is a cricket team based in Limerick, Ireland. The club is a member of the Munster Cricket Union and plays in competitions organised by the Union.

History
Limerick Cricket Club was founded in 1968 through the consolidation of the then existing Catholic Institute Cricket Team and that of the Limerick Protestant Young Men's Association (LPYMA).

The 1980s was a successful decade for the club. For the first time in 1982, the club won the Munster Senior Cup. The club won the trophy two further times in 1986 and 1988, and were beaten finalists in 1980 and 1984. The club also won the league in 1984, 1985 and 1988.

During the early 1990s the club won the Munster Junior Cup twice and a memorable Munster Minor Cup and League double in 1992. During the mid-to-late 1990s, the club won two Munster Senior Shields and the Munster Senior Cup in 1994.

In the early years of the millennium the club won the Munster Minor Cup in 2001 and Munster Senior Shields in 2003 and 2005 and Munster Senior League titles in 2004 and 2005. The club also won the Junior League in 2004 and the Junior Cup.

In 2011 the club's Minor Team had a remarkable season, ending with a Munster Minor Cup and League double.

In 2018 the club progressed through all rounds of the Cricket Ireland National Cup, narrowly losing out in the final to Rush CC.  In 2019 the club were successful in winning the Munster Minor T20 Cup.

Grounds
Since its inception, Limerick Cricket Club could well be described as nomadic. Initially the club's home ground was at the LPYMA ground until the early 1970s. The ground suffered from vandalism so a move was made to the Catholic Institute ground in Rosbrien, which was used for a couple of seasons; however, the wicket was difficult to maintain.

The Club then moved to the DeBeers (now Element Six) ground in Shannon, County Clare.

Because of the distance involved and drop in numbers from the Shannon contingent, it was decided to move back to Limerick to the Catholic Institute, and the name reverted to Limerick Cricket Club. After a couple of seasons at the Catholic Institute, the Club was on the move again. The nomadic nature of the club led to stints at Crescent College, the County Club on the Meelick road, Lord Harrington's Estate in Patrickswell, Old Crescent, and at the University of Limerick, which the club moved to in 1990.

In 2011 Limerick Cricket Club moved to its new grounds in Adare thereby ending the nomadic existence of the club. James Spencer has been head groundsman since the 2013 season.

Committee
The Club's committee for the 2021 season is comprised as follows:

Club Chairman: Chris Thomas
Financial Controller: John Lenehan
Treasurer: John Daly
Youth Development Officer: Sarfraz Ramay
Secretary: Stephen Hackett
First Team Captain: Arslan Anwar
Second Team Captain: Ajay Hari
Third Team Captain: Dharmesh Patel
Third Team Captain: Prithiv Mohan
Groundsman: James Spencer
Sponsorship Officer: Aftab Ahmed

Notable players
John McDevitt – Played for the Irish cricket team in 1986.

Honours

Munster Senior Cup (6) - 1982, 1984, 1986, 1988, 1992, 1994
Munster Senior League (7) - 1984, 1985, 1988, 1990, 1992, 2004, 2005
Munster Senior Shield (4) - 1998, 1999, 2003, 2005
Munster Senior Plate (2) - 2006, 2007
Munster Junior Cup (3) - 1988, 1992, 2005
Munster Junior League (6) - 1992, 2004, 2005, 2015, 2017, 2018
Munster Junior T20 Cup (1) - 2019
Munster Minor Cup (4) - 1992, 2001, 2011, 2017
Munster Minor League (3) - 1992, 2011, 2012
Munster Minor T20 Cup (1) - 2018

National Cup - Finalists 2018

External links
Official website

Cricket clubs established in 1968
Cricket clubs in Munster
1968 establishments in Ireland
Sports clubs in County Limerick
Limerick